Coenraad Victor Oosthuizen (born 22 March 1989), nicknamed 'Coenie' or 'Shrek', is a professional rugby union player for  in the English Premiership.

Rugby career

Oosthuizen went to Laerskool Gustav Preller in Roodepoort for his primary education and attended Grey College in Bloemfontein.

Oosthuizen plays in the loose-head prop position, although he can play both sides of the scrum. He boasts surprising pace for a man of his colossal weight (127 kg). He ended the 2010 Currie Cup season as the Cheetahs top try scorer. Oosthuizen is known for his strong runs and work rate around the pitch but has often struggled in the scrum against the more technical scrummagers.

In 2010 Coenie scored a hat trick of tries for the Free State Cheetahs in a Currie Cup game against the neighbouring Griquas team. It is after a stand-out season for the Cheetahs during the 2010 Currie Cup domestic rugby season that Coenie was selected as part of the Springbok squad for the November 2010 tour of Europe.

Oosthuizen made his first test appearance on 9 June 2012 against England in Durban.

On 13 May 2019, it was announced that he had signed a 3 year deal with Sale Sharks, and would join them after the conclusion of the 2019 Super Rugby season.

In 2016, Oosthuizen was included in a South Africa 'A' squad that played a two-match series against a touring England Saxons team. He came on as a replacement in their first match in Bloemfontein, but ended on the losing side as the visitors ran out 32–24 winners. He also played off the bench in the second match of the series, a 26–29 defeat to the Saxons in George.

International tries

Squads
Coenie Oosthuizen is/was involved in the following squads:
2014
Toyota Free State Cheetahs (Currie Cup)
Cheetahs (Super Rugby)
Springboks (2014 mid-year rugby union tests)
2013
Springboks (Outgoing Tours – British Isles & France)
Cheetahs (Super Rugby)
Springboks (2013 mid-year rugby union tests and 2013 Rugby Championship)
2012
Toyota Free State Cheetahs (Currie Cup)
Cheetahs (Super Rugby)
Springboks (one call-up against England)
2011
Toyota Free State Cheetahs (Currie Cup)
Cheetahs (Super Rugby)
Springboks (Tri-Nations (rugby union))
2010
Springboks (Outgoing Tours – British Isles)
Vodacom Free State Cheetahs (Currie Cup)
Cheetahs (Super Rugby)
2009
Vodacom Free State Cheetahs (Currie Cup)
South Africa National Under-20 (IRB Junior World Championship)
Cheetahs (Super Rugby)
2008
Free State U21 (ABSA Under 21 Competition)
Vodacom Free State Cheetahs (Currie Cup)
Vodacom Free State Cheetahs (Vodacom Cup)
Shimlas (FNB Varsity Cup)
2007
Free State U/19 (ABSA U/19 Competition)
SA Schools (SA Schools)
Free State (U18 Coca-Cola Craven Week)
2006
Free State (U18 Coca-Cola Craven Week)
2005
Free State (U16 Coca-Cola Grant Khomo Week)
2002
Golden Lions (U/13 Coca-Cola Craven Week)

References

External links

Cheetahs Profile
Oosthuizen's profile on itsrugby.co.uk

1989 births
Living people
Afrikaner people
Alumni of Grey College, Bloemfontein
Cheetahs (rugby union) players
Free State Cheetahs players
Rugby union players from Potchefstroom
Rugby union props
South Africa international rugby union players
South Africa Under-20 international rugby union players
South African people of Dutch descent
South African rugby union players
University of the Free State alumni
Expatriate rugby union players in England
South African expatriate sportspeople in England
South African expatriate rugby union players